True is the third studio album released by rap group, TRU. The album was released on July 25, 1995 for No Limit Records and features production from Al "Baby Jesus" Eaton, Kenneth Darnell Franklin, Percy Robert Miller (Master P), and Raymond Emile Poole (Mo B. Dick). Producer's Daryl Lee Anderson (DJ Daryl), Craig Stephen Lawson (Craig), Larry Dodson (Larry D), Mark Ogleton (CMT), Shon Adams (E-A-Ski), and Vyshonne Miller (Silkk the Shocker) are also featured on individual tracks.  This was the group's first major released after two independent albums and it managed to make it to #25 on the Top R&B/Hip-Hop Albums and #14 on the Top Heatseekers.

Track listing

References

1995 albums
TRU (group) albums
No Limit Records albums
Priority Records albums
G-funk albums